The Southern Championship is an association football league in Southern Tasmania.  It is jointly with the Northern Championship, the second highest level soccer competition in Tasmania. Nationally, it sits below the A-League and NPL Tasmania.  It is controlled by the Football Federation Tasmania (FFT). 

Prior to the 2015 season it was known as the Southern Premier League and for sponsorship reasons as the Forestry Tasmania Southern Premier League
Between 2001 and 2012 the Southern and Northern Premier Leagues were jointly the state's highest level of soccer competition (but still nationally below the NSL and A-League). During this period the two regional leagues determined a southern and northern champion, who then had a play-off for the state championship.

Current clubs (2022)

Honours

Multiple Champions

Individual awards
The Vic Tuting Medal is presented to the best and fairest player at the end of the season.

References

External links
 Football Federation Tasmania – official website
 Football Federation Tasmania – champions stats

Soccer leagues in Tasmania
Recurring sporting events established in 1900
1900 establishments in Australia
Sports leagues established in 1900